James M. Harvey (1833–1894) was a U.S. Senator from Kansas from 1874 to 1877.

Senator Harvey may also refer to:
Jonathan Harvey (congressman) (1780–1859), New Hampshire State Senate
Laning Harvey (1882–1942), Pennsylvania Senate
Louis P. Harvey (1820–1862), Wisconsin State Senate
Matthew Harvey (1781–1866), New Hampshire State Senate
Ted Harvey (fl. 1980s–2010s), Colorado State Senate
W. Brantley Harvey Sr. (1893–1981), South Carolina State Senate